The U.S. Figure Skating Championships is a figure skating competition held annually to crown the national champions of the United States. The competition is sanctioned by U.S. Figure Skating. In the U.S. skating community, the event is often referred to informally as "Nationals". Medals are currently awarded in four disciplines: men's (boys') singles, ladies' (girls') singles, pair skating, and ice dancing in four colors: gold (first), silver (second), bronze (third), and pewter (fourth) on two levels, senior and junior. Medals were previously given at the novice, intermediate, and juvenile levels. The event is also used to determine the U.S. teams for the World Championships, World Junior Championships, Four Continents Championships, and Winter Olympics, however, U.S. Figure Skating reserves the right to consider other results.

1981 4th place senior ladies was Vikki de Vries not Rosalyn Sumners.

Usage note
Unlike in other countries, such as Japan and Russia, where the "Junior National Championships" refers to the National Championships on the Junior level, in the United States, Junior-level skaters compete at the U.S. Championships. Juvenile- and Intermediate-level skaters are the skaters who compete at the "U.S. Junior Championships". The similar names for the events can cause confusion when Juvenile- and Intermediate-level skaters receive local media attention. Junior-level skaters compete at the "U.S. Championships on the Junior-level", whereas Juvenile and Intermediate skaters compete at the "U.S. Junior Championships".

In that vein, the "Junior national champion" is a skater who won Nationals on the Junior level, not a skater who won an event at the U.S. Junior Championships. Those skaters would be the Juvenile and Intermediate national champions.

Qualifying
Qualification for the U.S. Championships begins at one of nine regional competitions. The regions are New England, North Atlantic, South Atlantic, Upper Great Lakes, Eastern Great Lakes, Southwestern, Northwest Pacific, Central Pacific, and Southwest Pacific. The top four finishers in each regional advance to one of three sectional competitions (Eastern, Midwestern, and Pacific Coast). Skaters who place in the top four at sectionals advance to the U.S. Championships.

Skaters can also receive byes to the competition. Skaters can earn the right at the U.S. Championships without qualifying through a sectional championship by:
 placing first through fifth in each discipline at the previous national championships on the senior level
 winning a medal at the immediately previous World Championships (e.g., the 2009 World Championships were the immediately previous World Championships for the 2010 U.S. Championships)
 winning a medal at the immediately previous Olympic Winter Games (e.g., the 2006 Winter Olympics were the immediately previous Olympic Games for the 2010 U.S. Championships)
 qualifying for the Junior or the Senior Grand Prix Final. A skater competing in two disciplines will receive a bye only in the discipline in which he or she qualified to the Junior or Senior Grand Prix Final.

Skaters may also receive byes through a qualifying competition if they compete in an international event during the time that qualifying event is to take place. For example, if a skater is competing at an event at the same time as his or her regional competition, that skater would receive a bye to the corresponding sectional competition. If a skater is competing at an event at the same time as his or her sectional competition, that skater would qualify for the national event without having had to compete at a sectional championship.

Skaters may not compete in the same discipline at different levels in the same National Championship, but may compete in different disciplines at different levels. For example, a skater could not compete in both the junior ladies and senior ladies event, but could compete in both the junior ladies and the novice pairs event. Skaters are also not permitted to regress a level; if a skater has competed in senior ladies, she may not compete in junior ladies in any subsequent year.

There are no age limits to competing. The terms "novice", "junior", and "senior" refer to the level of skating, not the age of the competitors. Therefore, competitors on the senior level do not have to be old enough to compete internationally on the senior level, and competitors on the junior level do not have to be young enough to compete internationally on the junior level.

Note that the qualifying rules for the U.S. Championships have varied greatly over the history of the event. The regional qualifying event structure was not uniformly put in place until the 1966–67 season. Also, prior to this time, at sectional qualifying events skaters competed at one level above their national level, so (for instance) senior sectional champions qualified to skate at the junior, rather than senior, national level. Qualification for the senior national championship was through a separate set of rules, essentially based on results from the previous season. There have also been changes at various times to the number of skaters qualifying through sectionals, and to policies for byes.

Regions and sections
 Eastern Section:
 New England: Connecticut, Maine, Massachusetts, New Hampshire, Rhode Island, Vermont
 North Atlantic: New Jersey, New York, Northwestern Pennsylvania
 South Atlantic: Delaware, District of Columbia, Florida, Georgia, Maryland, North Carolina, Pennsylvania (excluding Northwest), South Carolina, Virginia, West Virginia, Chattanooga
 Midwestern Section:
 Eastern Great Lakes: Alabama, Indiana, Kentucky, Michigan (Lower Peninsula), Mississippi, Ohio, Tennessee (excluding Chattanooga)
 Upper Great Lakes: Illinois, Iowa, Michigan (Upper Peninsula), Minnesota, Missouri (except Kansas City), North Dakota, South Dakota, Wisconsin
 Southwestern: Arkansas, Colorado, Kansas, Louisiana, Nebraska, New Mexico, Oklahoma, Texas, Kansas City
 Pacific Coast Section:
 Northwest Pacific: Alaska, Idaho, Montana, Oregon, Washington, Wyoming
 Central Pacific: Northern California, Hawaii, Nevada, Utah
 Southwest Pacific: Arizona, Southern California

The Championship Series

During the 2020-21 and 2021-22 seasons, the traditional qualification system was replaced with The Championship Series due to the impact of COVID-19. The 2021 U.S. Championship Series took place in a virtual format from Nov. 10 – Dec. 6.  The top scores (Sr. Ladies (9), Sr. Men (9), Sr. Pairs (6), Jr. Ladies (12), Jr. Men (12), Jr. Pairs (8), Jr. Dance (10)) from the series advanced to the 2021 U.S. Figure Skating Championships. All Sr. Ice Dance teams who registered for the in-person qualifying season advanced to the 2021 U.S. Figure Skating Championships.

The 2022 U.S. Championship Series was a series of eight competitions from October 4-November 20. 
For senior singles, the top two total combined scores from each section and next best top three scores from the nation advanced to the 2022 U.S. Figure Skating Championships. For junior singles, the top three total combined junior scores from each section, the next best three total combined junior scores, and the top three  total combined novice scores advanced to the 2022 U.S. Figure Skating Championships. For pairs and ice dance, the top total combined scores (Sr. Pairs (5), Ice Dance (4), Jr. Pairs (9), Jr. Ice Dance (12)) advanced to the 2022 U.S. Figure Skating Championships.

Location

Senior medalists

Men

Women

 In June 1994, U.S. Figure Skating voted to strip Tonya Harding of her 1994 title. However, the competition results were not changed and the title was left vacant rather than moving all the other competitors up one position.

Pairs

Ice dancing

Men's figures

Ladies figures

Junior medalists

Men

Women

Pairs

Ice dance

Men's figures

Ladies figures

References

External links

 U.S. Figure Skating

 
Figure skating national championships
Figure skating in the United States